Hopewell is an unincorporated community in Houston County, Texas, United States. It is located at the intersection of U.S. Route 287 and County Roads 4525 and 4120. It lies at an elevation of 335 feet (102 m).

History 
Hopewell was established before 1900, but it is unknown who founded it. Hopewell was never more than a church and a few houses at its peak in 1930.  Most of the residents moved during World War II, but a few residents remained until the 1990s when it was a dispersed community.  Its most recent population estimate was 22, which was taken in 2000.

Education 
Any students In Hopewell attend the Crockett Independent School District.

References

Unincorporated communities in Houston County, Texas
Unincorporated communities in Texas